Gali Batu MRT Depot is a train depot located off Woodlands Road in Singapore. It provides maintenance services for the Downtown line of the Mass Rapid Transit system, with the capacity to stable up to 42 trains.

Construction of the 25 hectare at-grade depot, Singapore's first aboveground MRT depot to serve an underground MRT line, started in December 2008, which was opened on 27 December 2015. As part of the construction, 1,957 graves on part of the Kwong Hou Sua Teochew Cemetery had to be exhumed.

On 17 February 2015, the Land Transport Authority announced that the capacity of the depot will be expanded to stable 81 trains by 2019. Work commenced in January 2015 and is expected to be completed by 2019. 

The depot is located off Bukit Panjang station on the Downtown line and has 2 reception tracks: 2 tracks Expo-bound towards Bukit Panjang station.

References

Mass Rapid Transit (Singapore) depots
2015 establishments in Singapore